Ervin Kačar (born 25 October 1991) is a Serbian football right back.

Club career

Early years
Born in Novi Pazar, Kačar passed the youth school of the local football club with same name. He was a member of FK Pazar Juniors until 2013. After he spent 2014 with AS Koma Elektra in Austria, Ervin returned to his home town and joined Serbian League West side FK Jošanica for the spring half of the 2014–15 season. He also stayed with the club for the next season, after relegation in the Morava Zone League and was one of the best players, helping the team to return quickly to the League West. During the season, he was also a vice-captain, after experienced defender Edin Ferizović. Although he started his career as a more offensive player on the wing position, Kačar spent the mostly time with Jošanica as a right-back, but he also scored 5 goals, and was nominated for the best full-back of the league for the 2015–16 season.

Novi Pazar
In summer 2016, Kačar moved to Serbian SuperLiga club Novi Pazar, and signed two-year contract at the beginning of August. He made his debut for new club in 4th fixture of the 2016–17 Serbian SuperLiga season, replacing Slavko Marić in the 44 minute of the match. Kačar also made his Serbian Cup debut in a match against Mladost Bački Jarak, played on 21 September 2016. He started his first SuperLiga match on the field in the 16 fixture match against Vojvodina.

Career statistics

Club

Notes & references

External links
 
 
 

1991 births
Living people
Sportspeople from Novi Pazar
Association football defenders
Serbian footballers
Serbian expatriate footballers
Bosniaks of Serbia
FK Novi Pazar players
FK Pobeda players
OFK Petrovac players
KF Ferizaj players
KF Trepça '89 players
Serbian SuperLiga players
Macedonian First Football League players
Montenegrin First League players
Football Superleague of Kosovo players
Serbian First League players
Serbian expatriate sportspeople in Austria
Serbian expatriate sportspeople in Montenegro
Serbian expatriate sportspeople in Kosovo
Expatriate footballers in Montenegro
Expatriate footballers in Austria
Expatriate footballers in Kosovo